Arrigo Cervetto (16 April 1927 in Buenos Aires – 23 February 1995 in Savona) was an Italian communist revolutionary and politician. He was the co-founder of the newspaper Lotta Comunista with Lorenzo Parodi.

Biography 
Arrigo Cervetto was born in Buenos Aires to Amedeo Cervetto and Bernardina Pasquino, immigrants from Liguria. Upon reaching adulthood, he returned to his hometown in Liguria and became an apprentice steelworker in the "ILVA" complex, located in Savona. During his work, Arrigo Cervetto developed consciousness of the disparity between social classes. On July 25, 1943, he participated in the first demonstrations after the fall of Mussolini. On September 8, he fought as an anti-fascist partisan in Piedmont during the Italian Liberation War.

Arrigo Cervetto, along with Piero Parisotto and Antonio Bogliani, left the Italian Communist Party (PCI) after a year of service; he rejected the policies of Palmiro Togliatti. Togliatti wanted to break the tradition and accept alliances with international bourgeois forces. as a result, Arrigo declared himself an anarchist.

As an anarchist, Cervetto began to study Libertarian Communism, following the development of a libertarian ideology, along with figures like Umberto Marzocchi. In 1948, Arrigo Cervetto met Pier Carlo Masini and Lorenzo Parodi, who would become his political ally throughout his career.

In March 1950, he took part in a conference organized by the Ligurian Anarchist Federation in Genoa-Pontedecimo to concretely define the political struggle of the Italian Anarchist Federation. He collaborated with the Milanese newspaper The Libertarian (Italian: Il Libertario) from May 1950 to May 1951. He also worked on the Anarchist Groups of Proletarian Action's (GAAP) newspaper The Pulse (Italian: l'Impulso) from 1950 to 1957. During his time writing for The Pulse, he wrote many articles on the Cold War and Decolonization. However, he also explored the capitalistic nature of the Soviet Union, arguing the theory of State Capitalism.

Cervetto Arrigo theorized "Unitary Imperialism," starting with the"Imperialism" of Lenin, as opposed to the shared vision of a bipolar world divided into two camps, Soviet socialism and the American Capitalism. Cervetto states that both powers were imperialists and capitalists and that the unequal economic development compelled them to a continuous struggle for the hoarding of new markets, saying that the two superpowers were not so different in nature.

Also, in Genoa-Pontedecimo, from 24–25 February 1951, he helped found the "Anarchist Groups of Proletarian Action" (GAAP). He presented the thesis "Liquidation of the state as an apparatus of class." In his thesis, he argues that "the social revolution that installs a classless society is accomplished with the simultaneous liquidation of the bourgeoisie as a class and the liquidation of the state as an apparatus of class" and that "it's the task of the proletarian mass organizations (factory councils, agricultural community, people's committees) expropriate the capitalist system of its facilities and to take on the direct and collective management."

ILVA of Savona fired Cervetto in December 1950 during restructuring, and in May 1951, he would return to Argentina where he would stay for a year, until May 1952. The return to Savona would soon see him engaged in the political-theoretical struggle as he attempted to organize a revolutionary party. However, without a job, he no longer receives a regular salary. As such, he accepts to work for Feltrinelli, writing a biography of the "Worker's Movement of Savona." In those years, he deepened his historical research on the origins of class consciousness in the proletariat. Later, to survive, he accepted a job as a publisher's representative Giulio Einaudi Editore.

Collaboration with Azione Comunista

After the death of Stalin in 1953, and with the cold war beginning to thaw, Giulio Seniga, the former assistant of Secchia, founded the movement of "Azione Comunista" in 1954, a for dissent within the Italian Communist Party.

In December 1954, the Azione Comunista, the historical anti-Stalinist currents, the Anarchist Groups of Proletarian Action, the PC Internationalist of Onorato Damen, and the Trotskyists of the Revolutionary Communist Groups of Livio Maitan, made up the "Movement of the Communist Left," holding a demonstration at Cinema Dante in Milan.

Cervetto, contrary to the decision of the National Committee, was sent to Milan to work on the paper. He worked on the paper until August 1956, striving to counteract the maximalism and extremism, but with a primary goal of analyzing and defining the USSR's economic system as "state capitalism." Among the promoters of the Communist Action, there was Seniga; a group of other ex-PCI who still supported Stalinist communism, such as Raimondi and Vinazza; Pier Carlo Masini, who increasingly focused on the Italian Socialist Party; and one of the founders of the PCI, Bruno Fortichiari.

In 1957, the GAAP opened the First National Conference of the Movement of the Communist Left in Livorno, from 3–4 November 1957. Cervetto and Parodi, now holding clearly Leninist positions, present the "Thesis of 1957." In the thesis, they analyze the global cycle of capitalism and explicitly exclude the possibility of a global crisis in the short term. They also indicate the need to form a class party from "a deep and passionate theoretical work." However, differences of opinion caused the expulsion of Masini and Seniga, who then joined the PSI.

With the failure of the PSI limiting the possibility of making active changes to policy, Cervetto and Parodi spent much of 1960–61 analyzing China's economic system. The pair then defined China's economic policy as "nascent state capitalism." In 1963, differences of opinions caused a break with Raimondi and other ex-PCI sympathizers and Azione Comunista on China and the Maoist movement, who disagreed with Cervetto's thesis about Maoist China, who saw China's Economic policy as the result of a democratic-revolution by the bourgeois, and as state capitalism.

In 1963, Cervetto and Fortichiari decided to transfer the preparation and printing of Azione Comunista to Genoa. From April 1964, they published a series of Cervetto's Articles, which aimed to "make clear the basic lines of the Leninist conception of the party." It is a study (which would be collected two years later in a volume titled "Class struggle and the revolutionary party") of the Leninist concept of political action as the basis Scientific solution "to the problems left unsolved by the inclination of Amadeo Bordiga objectivist and subjectivist from that of Leon Trotsky."

Cervetto's research on this solution found an organic link between Capital by Karl Marx and the "What is to be done?" by Lenin; starting from here, he addresses the issue of workers' coalition. The last chapter focuses on the revolutionary party's role in the strategy's definition, such as the "result of a scientific analysis of a given stage of the class struggle."

Foundation of "Lotta comunista" 

After his break with Azione Comunista, Cervetto formed a new organization. In December 1965, he founded the Lotta Comunista party and started a vast work settlement organization.

The consolidation and development of the party allowed Cervetto to start a long career in political-economic analysis.

See also 

Lotta Comunista
Left Communism
Anti-stalinism
Leninism

References

Bibliography 
 Guido La Barbera, "Lotta comunista: Il gruppo originario 1943–1952," Milano, Lotta Comunista, 2012.
 Guido La Barbera, "Lotta comunista: Verso il partito strategia 1953–1965," Milano, Lotta Comunista, 2015.

1927 births
1995 deaths
Argentine anti-capitalists
Argentine emigrants to Italy
Argentine people of Ligurian descent
Italian anti-capitalists
Italian communists
People from Buenos Aires